Peter David Titanic (August 13, 1920 – January 20, 2014) was a Canadian football player who played for the Toronto Argonauts. He won the Grey Cup with them in 1946, 1947 and 1950. He previously played for the Toronto Balmy Beach Beachers. After his football career he worked for Leon's Furniture, retiring in 1988. He lived in Markham, Ontario in his later years, where he died in January 2014 of Alzheimer's disease.

References

External links
CFLapedia bio
Just Sport Stats

1920 births
2014 deaths
Sportspeople from Newmarket, Ontario
Players of Canadian football from Ontario
Toronto Argonauts players